Charles H. Morgan may refer to
 Charles Henry Morgan (1842–1912), American politician
 Charles Hale Morgan (1834–1875), American soldier of the Utah Expedition and the Civil War
 Charles Morgan (coach) (fl. 1938–1948), American football and basketball coach